"Cajun Love" is a single by Canadian country music artist Lucille Starr. The song debuted at number 36 on the RPM Country Tracks chart on April 14, 1969. It peaked at number 1 on June 16, 1969.

Chart performance

References

1969 singles
Lucille Starr songs
1969 songs
Epic Records singles